Isola Mantegna is a village within the comune (municipality) of Piazzola sul Brenta in Veneto, Italy. The town was initially named Isola di Carturo but changed its name to Isola Mantegna in 1963 to honor the notable Renaissance painter Andrea Mantegna, who was born there in 1431.

History 
In 1917-18, there was a World War I airfield in the fields nearby.

Notable residents 

 Andrea Mantegna ( 1431—1506), painter

References 

Cities and towns in Veneto